Tor remadevii, the orange-finned mahseer, also known as the hump-backed mahseer, is a critically endangered species of freshwater fish endemic to the Western Ghats of India. It is restricted to the Kaveri river basin.

It can be distinguished from other mahseer from the prominent hump on its back, and its bright orange caudal fin. It is considered a high-quality game fish, and has been proclaimed by anglers as "the largest and hardest fighting freshwater fish in the world". The reason for the species' endangerment is the introduction of a non-native "blue-finned mahseer" (generally considered to be Tor khudree, though the "blue-finned mahseer"'s classification is under scrutiny as it actually may be a different, undescribed species) to the Kaveri river basin. Also endangering this species is the heavy construction of dams along the Cauvery, as well as the use of dynamite fishing. These have led to a heavy crash in mahseer populations since 2004. Despite this endangered status, general lack of a formal scientific name has hampered efforts to protect species. However, a 2018 study found out that the orange-finned mahseer was in fact conspecific with Tor remadevii, a little-known species identified in 2007 based on a single juvenile individual from the Pambar River. This has allowed the species to finally gain a scientific name, which may help conservation efforts.

Gallery

References 

Cyprinidae
Cyprinid fish of Asia
Freshwater fish of India
Endemic fauna of the Western Ghats
Taxa named by B. Madhusoodana Kurup
Taxa named by Kizhakke Veetil Radhakrishnan
Fish described in 2007